The Aberdeen, Carolina and Western Railway  is a short-line railroad running from Aberdeen to Star, North Carolina. It was incorporated in 1987 and operates on a former Norfolk Southern Railway branch line. It also leases track from Norfolk Southern between Charlotte and Gulf, North Carolina.  It serves approximately 18 industries, mainly dealing in forest and agricultural products.

Fleet
The ACWR fleet, as of May 2018, consists of the following locomotives:

See also

Thoroughbred Shortline Program

References

External links
Official website
ACWR Facebook page
Railway Association of North Carolina - ACWR
American Short Line & Regional Railroad Association: ACWR

North Carolina railroads
Spin-offs of the Norfolk Southern Railway